The Joseph Buffett House is a historic house located at 169 West Rogues Path in Cold Spring Harbor, Suffolk County, New York.

Description and history 
It consists of a -story, five-bay wide, shingle-sided dwelling built in about 1830, with a -story, three-bay wide, saltbox shingle-sided wing built in about 1750. It is one of the oldest intact residences in Cold Spring Harbor village.

It was added to the National Register of Historic Places on September 26, 1985.

References

Houses on the National Register of Historic Places in New York (state)
Houses completed in 1750
Houses in Suffolk County, New York
National Register of Historic Places in Suffolk County, New York